Reen Manor is a hamlet east of Perranporth in Cornwall, England.

References

Hamlets in Cornwall